Struggle may refer to:

Film and TV
 Struggle (2003 film), an Austrian film
 Struggle (2013 film)
 Struggle (TV series), 2007 Chinese TV series

Music
 Struggle (Nonpoint album), 1999 release
 Struggle (Woody Guthrie album), 1990
 "Struggle", a track on Ashanti's 2008 album The Declaration
 "Struggle", a 1989 song by Keith Richards
 "Struggle", a 2002 song by Radio 4

See also
 Class struggle, a key concept in Marxism
 Conflict
 My Struggle, or Mein Kampf, book by Adolf Hitler
 The Struggle (disambiguation)